Deduction and induction may refer to:
 Deductive reasoning
 Inductive reasoning
 Validity (logic)
 Cogency (disambiguation)